Puerto Rico Highway 151 (PR-151) is a rural road located in the municipality of Villalba, Puerto Rico. This highway begins at PR-150 in downtown Villalba and ends at PR-143 in Caonillas Arriba.

Major intersections

See also

 List of highways numbered 151

References

External links
 

151
Villalba, Puerto Rico